Jack Alexander Haynes (born 30 January 2001) is an English cricketer. He made his List A debut for Worcestershire against the West Indies A in a tri-series warm-up match on 19 June 2018. He made his first-class debut for Worcestershire against Australia on 7 August 2019. In October 2019, he was named in the England under-19 cricket team's squad for a 50-over tri-series in the Caribbean. In December 2019, he was named in England's squad for the 2020 Under-19 Cricket World Cup. He made his Twenty20 debut on 29 August 2020, for Worcestershire in the 2020 t20 Blast.

In May 2022, in the 2022 County Championship, Haynes scored his maiden century in first-class cricket, with an unbeaten 120 against Durham.

References

External links
 

2001 births
Living people
English cricketers
Worcestershire cricketers
Sportspeople from Worcester, England
People educated at Malvern College
Herefordshire cricketers
Oval Invincibles cricketers